Pyotr Ivanovich Poletika (15 August 1778 – 26 January 1849, occasionally referred to in the West as Pierre de Poletica) was the second Russian ambassador to the United States.

Biography 
Poletika was born in 1778 and enjoyed an aristocratic education. His father Ivan Poletika (1722—1783) was a medical scientist. His mother was of Turkish origin.

He served in various diplomatic posts and was a senator. From 1817 to 1822, he was the Russian ambassador to the United States.

He died in 1849, and his memoirs were published posthumously in 1885.

See also
 Russo-American Treaty of 1824

References

Footnotes

Sources 

 

1778 births
1849 deaths
Ambassadors of Russia to the United States
Russian people of Turkish descent
Russian nobility